Ernest Henry Westmore (October 29, 1904 – February 1, 1967), was a Hollywood make-up artist and sometimes actor, the third child in George Westmore's famed Westmore family tree. Perc Westmore's twin, the two were born in 1904 in Canterbury, England, later moving to Canada and then the United States.

Career

Considered the most talented of the Westmore brothers, Ern found work at Warner Bros. studio, RKO Studios, and Eagle-Lion Studios.  He was the director of make-up on over 50 films during his career, and was also featured as himself in a number of B-movie-style features for Kroger Babb, including One Too Many, and Secrets of Beauty, also known as Why Men Leave Home, an instructional primer for women regarding how to keep their husbands faithful.

Ern was also involved in the creation of the House of Westmore with three of his brothers.  It was billed as a place of beauty, primarily for women, and Ern was forced to borrow $40,000 from John Barrymore and Errol Flynn to assist in the financing, never paying them back.

In 1955, Babb set Westmore up with his own television series.  Originally called Hollywood Today, but also called Hollywood Backstage and The Ern Westmore Show, The Ern Westmore Hollywood Glamour Show was a program featuring make-up tips and beauty suggestions.

Ern struggled with alcoholism throughout his life, drinking as early as 1921.  Often involved with Barrymore, John Decker, and W. C. Fields, Ern would eventually be forced out of Warner Bros. because of his alcohol problem.  It eventually led to work with One Too Many. Ern also struggled in his personal life due to his vices, having been married four times during his life, fathering two children.

Ern died in New York City in 1967 of an apparent heart attack.

Grandson Robert B. Crawley, Jr., son of Muriel Westmore Crawley and Bob Crawley, Sr., was art director at Universal Studios.

See also

Westmore family

References

External links
 
 

American television personalities
American male film actors
British make-up artists
1904 births
1969 deaths
English emigrants to the United States
English emigrants to Canada
English twins
20th-century American male actors
Burials at Hollywood Forever Cemetery
Ern